Law without the state (also called transnational stateless law, stateless law, or private legal orderings)  is law made primarily outside of the power of a state. 

Such law may be established in several ways:

 It may emerge in systems such as existed in feudal Europe prior to the emergence of the modern nation state with the treaty of Westphalia.  
 It can be established as customary law such as that practiced by indigenous communities. 
 Non-state actors may create it, for instance in the form of "soft law".
 According to various anarchist theories, it could result from how a society would organize itself without formal government.

References

Jurisprudence
Philosophy of law
Without state
Legal ethics
Vigilantism
Anarchism